This list of works by Norman Foster categorizes the work of the Pritzker Prize-winning architect. Foster has established an extremely prolific career in the span of four decades. The following are some of his major constructions:

Completed projects

1967, Reliance Controls factory, Swindon, UK; joint project with Richard Rogers in Team 4
1969–1971, Fred. Olsen Lines terminal, London Docklands, UK
1970–1971, IBM Pilot Head Office, Cosham, Portsmouth, UK
1971–1975, Willis Faber and Dumas Headquarters, Ipswich, UK
1973–1977, Beanhill Housing Estate, Milton Keynes, UK
1974–1978, Sainsbury Centre for Visual Arts at the University of East Anglia, Norwich, UK
1980–1982, Renault Centre, Swindon, UK
1979–1986, HSBC Main Building, Hong Kong
1981–1991, Terminal building at London Stansted Airport, UK
1990, Headquarters of ITN, 200 Grays Inn Road, London UK
1992, Torre de Collserola, Barcelona, Spain
1984–1993, Carré d'Art, Nîmes, France
1993, Kings Norton Library, Cranfield University, UK
1993, Lycée Albert Camus, Fréjus, France
1994, Joslyn Art Museum, Omaha, Nebraska, United States
1988–1995, Metro of Bilbao, Spain
1995, Faculty of Law, Cambridge
1995–1997, The Clyde Auditorium, part of the Scottish Exhibition and Conference Centre in Glasgow, Scotland, UK
1995–1997, The American Air Museum, part of the Imperial War Museum, Duxford
1996, National Sea Life Centre, Birmingham, UK
1991–1997, Commerzbank Tower, Frankfurt, Germany
1992–1998, Hong Kong International Airport, Chek Lap Kok, Hong Kong
1993–1998, Valencia Congress Centre, Valencia, Spain
1995–1999, Rotherbaum Multimedia Centre, Hamburg, Germany 
1998, World Port Center, Rotterdam, The Netherlands
1998, Portsmouth Damm, Duisburg, Germany
1999, Canary Wharf tube station, London Underground, London UK
1999, Redevelopment of the Great Court of the British Museum, London, UK
1999, Social Sciences Division, Manor Road Building, University of Oxford, UK
1999, Reichstag restoration, Berlin, Germany
2000, Greater London Authority Building (London City Hall), London, UK
2000, The Great Glasshouse of the National Botanic Garden of Wales, Llanarthney, UK 
1996–2000, Millennium Bridge, London, UK
2000, Center for Clinical Science Research, Stanford University, Palo Alto, United States
2001, Expo MRT station, Singapore
1994–2001, Al Faisaliyah Center, Riyadh, Saudi Arabia (with architectural artist Brian Clarke)
2001, La Poterie metro station, Rennes, France
2001, J Sainsbury headquarters, Holborn Circus, London, UK
1999–2001, Lionel Robbins Building renovation, British Library of Political and Economic Science, London School of Economics, London, UK
2002, 8 Canada Square (HSBC Group Head Office), London, UK
1997–2003, Metropolitan Building in Warsaw, Poland
2003, Clark Center, Stanford University, Palo Alto, United States
2003, Universiti Teknologi Petronas main campus, Perak, Malaysia
2003, Capital City Academy, London, UK
1997–2004, 30 St Mary Axe, Swiss Re London headquarters, London, UK
2004, The Sage Gateshead, Gateshead, UK
2004, Moor House, London, UK
2004, McLaren Technology Centre, Woking, UK
2004, Tanaka Business School, Imperial College London, UK
2004, The Millau Viaduct, near Millau, France
2005, Supreme Court Building, Singapore
2005, Western Årsta Bridge, Stockholm, Sweden
2005, 40 luxury apartments, St. Moritz, Switzerland
2005, National Police Memorial, The Mall, London, UK
2005, The Philological Library at the Free University of Berlin, Germany
2005, Deutsche Bank Place, Sydney, Australia (the first Sir Norman Foster building in the Southern Hemisphere)
2002–2006, Dresden Hauptbahnhof reconstruction, Dresden, Germany
2006, Hearst Tower, New York City, United States
2006, Leslie L. Dan Pharmacy Building at the University of Toronto, Toronto, Ontario, Canada
2006, Palace of Peace and Reconciliation, Astana, Kazakhstan (with architectural artist Brian Clarke)
2002–2007, Wembley Stadium, London, UK
2004–2007, The Willis Building, City of London, UK
2005–2007, Thomas Deacon Academy
2004–2007, Kogod Courtyard, Center for American Art and Portraiture at the National Portrait Gallery, Washington, DC
2007, International Terminal, Beijing Capital International Airport, Beijing, China
2006–2008, Lumiere residences, Regent Place, Sydney, Australia
2006–2008, John Spoor Broome Library, California State University Channel Islands, United States.
2007–2008, New Elephant House, Copenhagen Zoo, Copenhagen, Denmark
2004–2008, Torre Cepsa, Madrid, Spain.
2007-2010, Bodegas Portia's building, Gumiel de Izán, Spain
2009–2010, Sperone Westwater, New York
2010, Art of the Americas Wing at the Museum of Fine Arts, Boston, Boston, Massachusetts, United States
2010, Buenos Aires City Government Headquarters, Buenos Aires
2003–2010, Florence TAV Station, Florence, Italy 
2006–2010, Khan Shatyr Entertainment Center in Astana, Kazakhstan.
2004–2011, Jameson House (Vancouver), Vancouver, British Columbia, Canada
2004–2011, The Troika, Kuala Lumpur, Malaysia (2004–2009)
2007–2011, The Bow, Calgary, Alberta, Canada 
2002–2013, Lenbachhaus, Munich, Germany
2005–2013, The SSE Hydro, Glasgow, Scotland, UK 
2012, Campus Luigi Einaudi, part of the University of Turin, Turin, Italy
2013, Faena Aleph Residences, Buenos Aires, Argentina
2013, Ombrelle, Old Port, Marseille, France.
2014, Edward P. Evans Hall, Yale School of Management, Yale University, New Haven, Connecticut, USA
2014, Apple Store, Zorlu Center, Istanbul
2014, Yacht Club de Monaco, Monte Carlo, Monaco
2014, CityCenterDC, Washington, D.C.
2015, Apple Store, West Lake, Hangzhou
2015, Ilham Tower, Kuala Lumpur, Malaysia
2016, South Beach, Singapore
2017, Apple Park, Cupertino, California 3
2018, Comcast Innovation and Technology Center, Philadelphia, PA.
 2018 DUO, apartment building, Central Park, Sydney, Australia.
2019, BBC Cymru Wales New Broadcasting House, Cardiff, Wales, UK
2019, Samson Pavilion, Cleveland Clinic, Cleveland, OH.
2020, Russian Copper Company Headquarters, Yekaterinburg, Russia
2020, Apple Store, Marina Bay Sands, Singapore
2020, Apple Store, CentralWorld, Bangkok, Thailand
2021, The Pavilion, University of Pennsylvania, Philadelphia
2022, Salesforce Tower, Sydney, Australia

Proposed or under construction
 Magdi Yacoub Heart Foundation , Cairo, Egypt
Zayed National Museum, Abu Dhabi, United Arab Emirates
APIIC Tower, Hyderabad, India (2007–2020)
Amaravati city masterplan, Andhra Pradesh, India (2017-2025).
Culture and Leisure Centre, Ciudad del Motor de AragónCarbon neutral design wins Motor City competition in Aragon Spain | Foster + Partners, Alcañiz, Spain (2007) (competition won)
 Techo Takhmao International Airport, Phnom Penh, Cambodia (2019–2025)
 200 Greenwich Street, Tower 2 of the planned reconstruction of the World Trade Center in New York City, United States (under construction).
 Reconstruction of New Holland Island, Saint Petersburg, Russia (ongoing)
 U2 Tower, Dublin, Ireland (2008–2011) (competition won) (construction postponed)
 Crystal Island, Moscow, Russia
 Hermitage Plaza, Paris (La Défense), France
Edmond and Lily Safra Center for Brain Sciences, Hebrew University of Jerusalem, Israel.
 Royal Hamilius Centre, Luxembourg
Milano Santa Giulia residential district, Milan, Italy
 Restoration of the 'Hall of Realms' (Salón de Reinos) as an expansion of the Prado Museum in Madrid, Spain (completion later than 2024).
 Omkar 1973, apartment building, Worli, Mumbai (completion 2018).
 Bilbao Fine Arts Museum expansion, Bilbao, Spain (competition won, 2019)
 Torre Córdoba y Alem, Buenos Aires, Argentina (under construction)
 One Beverly Hills, Three tower complex adjacent the Beverly Hilton in Los Angeles, California. Towers approved and expected by 2026. urbanize.com

Non-architectural projects
Foster's other design work has included the Nomos desk system for Italian manufacturer Tecno, chairs and other furniture for American manufacturer Emeco, the wind turbine housings for Enercon, and the motor yacht Izanami (later Ronin) for Lürssen Yachts.

In October 2010, CNN announced that Foster recreated Buckminster Fuller's Dymaxion car.

References

External links

 Foster and Partners
 Bio at the Pritzker Prize

Foster, Norman